Night Glider is an album by the American jazz organist Groove Holmes recorded at New York City's Bell Sound Studios in 1973 and released on the Groove Merchant label.

Reception 

Allmusic'''s Matt Collar wrote, "Night Glider'' is a solid early-'70s funk-jazz set."

Track listing
 "Night Glider" (Horace Ott) – 5:20
 "Fly Jack" (Ott) – 3:34
 "It's Going to Take Some Time" (Carole King, Toni Stern) – 4:30
 "Pure Sugar Cane" (Richard "Groove" Holmes) – 4:59
 "Go Away Little Girl" (Gerry Goffin, King) – 5:32
 "One Mint Julep" (Rudy Toombs) – 4:55
 "Young and Foolish" (Albert Hague, Arnold B. Horwitt) – 4:22

Personnel
Groove Holmes – organ
Garnett Brown − trombone
Seldon Powell − tenor saxophone
Horace Ott − electric piano
Lloyd Davis − guitar
Paul Martinez – bass guitar
Bernard Purdie − drums
Kwasi Jayourba – congas, bongos

References

Groove Merchant albums
Richard Holmes (organist) albums
1973 albums
Albums produced by Sonny Lester